Jim Lumby is an English former footballer who played as a forward in the Football League for Grimsby Town, Scunthorpe United, Carlisle United, Tranmere Rovers and Mansfield Town.

References

1954 births
Living people
Footballers from Grimsby
Association football forwards
English footballers
Grimsby Town F.C. players
Boston United F.C. players
Gainsborough Trinity F.C. players
Brigg Town F.C. players
Scunthorpe United F.C. players
Carlisle United F.C. players
Tranmere Rovers F.C. players
Mansfield Town F.C. players
English Football League players